"Ain't No Love (Ain't No Use)" is a song by British dance music act Sub Sub, released on 29 March 1993 as the second single from their debut album, Full Fathom Five (1994). It features Temper Temper's Melanie Williams on vocals. The song was the act's biggest single, reaching number three on the UK Singles Chart, number one on the UK Dance Singles Chart and becoming one of many dance singles in 1993 to cross over into mainstream popularity in the UK. In the accompanying music video, Jimi Goodwin plays bass, Jez Williams plays keyboards and percussion, and Andy Williams plays keytar. After struggling to repeat the success of the single, and after a fire destroyed the band's Ancoats studio in 1996, the group eventually reformed with a radically different sound as Doves in 1998.

Background and release
Twin brothers Andy and Jez used to go to a fair when they were kids. One day Andy won a record there. They brought it home and played it, but didn't like it. The record was put away. In 1991, after Sub Sub had a hit with "Space Face" they wanted to make a follow-up to it. They spent time searching for the right sample they could use in the new song. Then Jez put the forgotten record from the fair on. It was "Good Morning Starshine" by Revelation. Jimi learned to play the bassline on a Roland Juno-106 keyboard, and the whole track came together quickly.  There is also another well-known sample on there, but it has never been officially known what it is, only that it is a sound, rather than a song. The band had only done instrumental and wanted to find someone to sing lyrics to their melody. Jimi's best friend, Joe Roberts, was dating singer Melanie Williams from the soul band Temper Temper at that time. They contacted her and she thought it was perfect. Williams also wrote the third verse for the song. The track was then recorded at Revolution Studios in Manchester. Sub Sub's manager Dave Rofe, Rob's Records' Pete Robinson and North South's promoter Karen Hampton were targeting BBC Radio 1 and taste-making DJ Pete Tong to give the song a listen. He got right behind it and it spread like wildfire through Radio 1. The band and Williams also performed the song on the British music chart television programme Top of the Pops after they were the highest new entry at number ten on the UK Singles Chart. The single sold in 700,000 copies and peaked at number three in April 1993.

Chart performance
"Ain't No Love (Ain't No Use)" proved to be quite successful on the charts across several continents. It made it to the top five in the United Kingdom, where it peaked at number three in its third week at the UK Singles Chart, on 18 April 1993. The single spent six weeks inside the UK top 10. On the UK Dance Singles Chart, it was even more successful, reaching the number one position. It was a top-20 hit in Ireland (13) and the Netherlands (18), as well as on the Eurochart Hot 100, where it hit number 11 in May 1993. "Ain't No Love (Ain't No Use)" was also a hit in Belgium, where it went to number 47. Outside Europe, it charted in Australia and Israel, peaking at number 11 and 23. The single earned a silver record in the UK, after 200,000 units were sold there.

Critical reception
Tom Ewing of Freaky Trigger declared the song as "excellent" and "tune-heavy, hands-high dance-pop". Katrine Ring from Gaffa felt that "it is almost like hearing Deelite. Grooovey!" In his weekly UK chart commentary, James Masterton said, "A hit almost before it had ever started, this track popular not only in the clubs but also extremely radio friendly. A timely piece of production as well with the Philly-sounding strings and wah-wah guitar making the track sound as if it is straight out of the 1970s. Disco returns with a 90s flavour I suppose and Top 3 is almost guaranteed." Australian music channel Max included it in their list of "1000 Greatest Songs of All Time" in 2012. A reviewer from The Mix viewed it as "great". Pan-European magazine Music & Media wrote that "the arrangements are smoothly funky and combined with a voice that soothes like honey and rings like a bell, you can feel that real party enthusiasm which is so reminiscent of late '70s disco." They also described the song as "70s disco in a trendy club style". Andy Beevers from Music Week said it "is something of a revelation – a fresh, funky and very different disco-influenced track with excellent catchy vocals. It has been generating a huge buzz in the clubs and should be a big hit." James Hamilton from the RM Dance Update described it as a "smash-bound jaunty leaper like Deee-Lite combining Eric Burdon & War's "Spill the Wine" with Marvin Gaye's "Got to Give It Up"".

Track listings

 UK and Australian CD single, Australian cassette single
 "Ain't No Love (Ain't No Use)" (radio edit)
 "Ain't No Love (Ain't No Use)" (original mix)
 "Ain't No Love (Ain't No Use)" (Parkside mix)
 "Ain't No Love (Ain't No Use)" (On the House mix)

 UK 7-inch and cassette single
 "Ain't No Love (Ain't No Use)" (original edit)
 "Ain't No Love (Ain't No Use)" (Parkside mix)

 UK 12-inch single
A1. "Ain't No Love (Ain't No Use)" (original mix)
B1. "Ain't No Love (Ain't No Use)" (Parkside mix)
B2. "Ain't No Love (Ain't No Use)" (Parkside raw dub)

 UK 12-inch single—On remixes
 "Ain't No Love (Ain't No Use)" (On the Floor)
 "Ain't No Love (Ain't No Use)" (On the House)
 "Ain't No Love (Ain't No Use)" (On Yer Face)

 French CD single
 "Ain't No Love (Ain't No Use)" (radio edit) – 2:46
 "Ain't No Love (Ain't No Use)" (Parkside mix) – 7:43

 Australian CD and cassette single—remixes
 "Ain't No Love (Ain't No Use)" (Rubber Band mix)
 "Ain't No Love (Ain't No Use)" (original 12-inch mix)
 "Ain't No Love (Ain't No Use)" (Parkside raw dub mix)
 "Ain't No Love (Ain't No Use)" (radio edit)

Charts

Weekly charts

Year-end charts

Certifications

Usage in media
The song was featured in the 1997 American film Romy and Michele's High School Reunion but was not featured on the soundtrack album.

References

External links
 

1993 singles
1993 songs
Melanie Williams songs
Music Week number-one dance singles
Songs written by Andy Williams (Doves)
Songs written by Jez Williams
Songs written by Jimi Goodwin
British dance songs
 Sub Sub songs